Monardella nana is a species of flowering plant in the mint family known by the common name yellow monardella. It is native to the Peninsular Ranges of southern California and northern Baja California, where it grows in several local habitat types, such as chaparral and mountain forest.

Description
Monardella nana is a rhizomatous perennial herb forming a tuft or mat of slender stems lined with hairy to hairless oval leaves up to 3 centimeters long. The inflorescence is a head of several flowers blooming in a cup of pink-tinged white bracts. The tubular flowers are white to pale pink in color and up to 3 centimeters long.

There are several subspecies of this plant, all limited to the mountains straddling the border between California and Baja California.

External links
 Calflora Database: Monardella nana (yellow monardella, little monardella)
 Jepson Manual eFlora (TJM2) treatment of Monardella nana
 USDA Plants Profile for Monardella nana
 UC Photos gallery — Monardella nana

nana
Flora of California
Flora of Baja California
Natural history of the California chaparral and woodlands
Natural history of the Peninsular Ranges
Taxa named by Asa Gray
Flora without expected TNC conservation status